The Battle of 33rd Street rivalry refers to the men's college basketball rivalry between Drexel University and University of Pennsylvania ('Penn') in Philadelphia, Pennsylvania. The rivalry is fueled by the proximity of the schools to each other, as the rivalry is known for being the closest geographical rivalry in US college sports. The campuses of the two schools share a physical border, and the teams' home courts are mere blocks away from each other, as Drexel's Daskalakis Athletic Center is located at 34th and Market Street, and Penn's historic Palestra is located on 33rd Street south of Walnut Street.  The series was originally played at the Palestra every year until 2015 with the exception of the 2008 game, when Penn played at Drexel University for the first time in team history.  Beginning in 2015, the location began alternating between the two schools.

The teams began playing against each other annually during the 1996–97 NCAA basketball season.  Previous to this season, the teams faced each other only eight times.  Seven of those games were during the 1920s, where Penn won all seven, and the eighth game was in 1988, where Drexel won 70–69.

Results

The game on December 19, 1928 was scheduled to be the first game played at Drexel, in the newly constructed Curtis Hall, however construction was not completed in time and the game was moved to Palestra.

In 2008, at the first game in the series to be played at the Daskalakis Athletic Center, the game was featured on ESPN Hoops Marathon and tipped off at 10 a.m.

Hiatus in 2011, 2013–2014, 2017–2021

In the 2011–12 season, Drexel and Penn did not play against each other, ending a 14-year streak due to a dispute over where the game should be played.  In 1997, the teams agreed to play their games at the Palestra, as it is where many Philadelphia Big 5 and City 6 games are generally played at.  However, since then, Drexel's basketball team had greatly improved, and Drexel favored changing the series structure so that the location would alternate between the schools each season.  The teams resumed play in the 2012–13 season at The Palestra, but did not play again until the 2015–16 season, when Penn agreed to resume the series at Drexel.  From that point forward, the location of the game would supposedly alternate between The Palestra and Daskalakis Athletic Center each season, although after Drexel returned to the Palestra in the 2016–17 season, the teams did not continue the series until 2022.

Other Events
The schools also occasionally face each other in other sports, including lacrosse, women's basketball, and field hockey.
 
On March 11, 2014, Drexel and Penn faced each other in the first round of the 2014 NCAA Division I Men's Lacrosse Championship. The teams earned automatic bids by winning each of their conference tournaments, and marked Drexel's first invitation to the national championship. The game was played at Franklin Field, and the Dragons defeated the Quakers by score of 16–11 to advance to the tournament quarterfinals.

References

College basketball rivalries in the United States
Drexel Dragons men's basketball
Penn Quakers men's basketball
Basketball in Philadelphia